The 1911 Southwest Texas State Normal School football teamwas an American football team that represented Southwest Texas State Normal School—now known as Texas State University–as an independent during th 1911 college football season. In its second season under head coach James R. Coxen, the team compiled a 1–3 record. A. W. Graham was the team's captain.

Schedule

References

Southwest Texas State
Texas State Bobcats football seasons
College football winless seasons
Southwest Texas State Bobcats football